The Settawya Pagoda is a Buddhist temple in Mingun, Myanmar. Built in the early 19th-century at the behest of King Bodawpaya Konbaung, the temple is one of several prominent pagodas in Mingun; the structure at Settawya was built during the same time as the larger-yet-uncompleted Mingun Pahtodawgyi, which was also built on the orders of Bodawpaya. The stark-white Settwaya Pagoda is located several hundred feet from the Irrawaddy River, and the temple contains a marble footprint of the Buddha.

The pagoda survived a major earthquake in 1839, though the structure sustained some damage; its interior has since been reinforced against future earthquakes.

References 

Buddhist pilgrimage sites in Myanmar
Pagodas in Myanmar
Historic sites in Myanmar
Religious buildings and structures completed in 1811
19th-century Buddhist temples